In toxicology, Haber's rule or Haber's law is a mathematical statement of the relationship between the concentration of a poisonous gas and how long the gas must be breathed to produce death, or other toxic effect. The rule was formulated by German chemist Fritz Haber in the early 1900s.

Rule
Thus, the rule states that doubling the concentration will halve the time, for example.

It makes equivalent any two groupings of dose concentration and exposure time that have equivalent mathematical products.  For instance, if we assign dose concentration the symbol C, and time the classic t, then for any two dose schema, if C1t1=C2t2, then under Haber's rule the two dose schema are equivalent.

Haber's rule is an approximation, useful with certain inhaled poisons under certain conditions, and Haber himself acknowledged that it was not always applicable.

However, because of its simplicity, Haber's rule continued to be widely used. Recently, some researchers have argued that it is time to move beyond the simple relationship expressed by Haber's rule and to make regular use of more sophisticated models.

See also

Toxicology
Chemical warfare
Area under the curve

References

Pharmacokinetics
Toxicology
Fritz Haber